Flexopecten hyalinus, the hyaline scallop, is a species of saltwater clams, a scallop, a marine bivalve mollusc in the family Pectinidae, the scallops.

Description
This shell is delicate, with a brown or pale brown surface, almost translucent and has quite flat ribs.

Distribution
This species can be found in the Mediterranean Sea, from Italy and Croatia to Greece, under rocks or dead leaves of algae, usually at depths of about 10 m.

References

Schiaparelli, Stefano (2006). Bivalvi, in: Revisione della Checklist della fauna marina italiana.
Pesi

Pectinidae
Bivalves described in 1795
Taxa named by Giuseppe Saverio Poli